The 203 mm /50 Model 1924 was an Italian 203 mm (8 inch) naval gun. Manufactured by the Ansaldo engineering company in the years before World War II for the Italian Navy, the use of these guns was limited to the Trento-class heavy cruisers and coastal defense batteries during the second world war.

Construction
These guns were of built-up construction with a fixed liner, autofretted barrel, and a Welin breech block. The gun mounts had electrically powered training, elevation, hoists and rammers. There was no swinging arm, and shell hoists were of pusher type with loading at +15°. The main reason for the dispersion problem was because the guns were mounted too close together on a common cradle, which together with a narrow  ball track complicated loading of the guns.

Naval Service
This gun was limited to two superfiring twin-mount turrets forward and aft on the heavy cruisers Trento and Trieste during World War II.

Coastal Defense Service
One spare turret was used for coastal defense.

Ammunition
Ammunition was of separate loading type.

The gun was able to fire:
 Armor Piercing (early) - 
 Armor Piercing (late) - 
 High Explosive -

Notes

References
 

203 mm artillery
World War II naval weapons
World War II artillery of Italy
Naval guns of Italy